Felix Tobias Herngren (born 4 February 1967), is a Swedish director, actor, writer and comedian. He is known for creating and acting in the Swedish television drama-comedy series Solsidan. He is the younger brother of director and actor Måns Herngren.

Herngren also directed and wrote the film The Hundred-Year-Old Man Who Climbed Out the Window and Disappeared which has been screened in more than 40 countries and grossing more than 50 million US dollars worldwide. He also appeared in the TV programme Sen kväll med Luuk.

Selected filmography
1990: S*M*A*S*H
1997: Adam & Eva
1999: Vuxna människor (Grown Up People)
2000: Naken (Naked)
2004: Terkel in Trouble (Swedish voice for all the characters)
2006: Varannan vecka (Every Other Week)
2007: Hjälp! (Help!, TV-series)
2010: Solsidan
2013: The Hundred-Year-Old Man Who Climbed Out the Window and Disappeared
2016: The 101-Year-Old Man Who Skipped Out on the Bill and Disappeared
2017: Solsidan (film)

References

External links

1967 births
Living people
Swedish male actors
Swedish comedians
Swedish television directors